The Alsace independence movement is a cultural, ideological and political regionalist movement for greater autonomy or outright independence of Alsace.

Purposes generally include opposition to centralist territorial, political and legal pretensions of either France ("Jacobin policies"), including the new French region Grand Est since 1 January 2016, and Pan-Germanism of Germany; or both. It instead generally favours regional decentralization including political and fiscal autonomy for Alsace, promoting the defense of its culture, history, traditions, and bilingualism of the Alsatian language. A slogan that has sometimes occurred in protests in the 21st century is "Elsass frei" ("Alsace free").

Several mass protests have taken place in public places around Alsace in opposition to the French region of Grand Est, with ratification on 1 January 2016. In addition, several Alsatian organisations and political parties have been formed to promote the cause, notably Alsace d'abord and Unser Land.

The movement of greater autonomy of Alsace runs partly parallel to that of Alemannic separatism, originating in the Napoleonic era (ca. 1805–1815) and briefly revived both after World War I (1919) and after World War II (1946–1952).

History

Background 
Due to expansionist doctrines of France since the time of Louis XIV, Alsatians have been subject to many shifts in European history.

Over the centuries, many figures and organisations have contributed to the cause of rejected either or both of these pretentions, promoting varying degrees of autonomy or even independence, both in public and in form of political participation.

Various autonomist and separatist movements in Alsace have received support from over the political spectrum, including left, centre and right, comprising diverse political ideologies.

19th century
Alsatian Workers and Peasants Party

World War II 
The establishment of Nazi Germany and its annexation of Alsace-Lorraine during the World War II, introduced a new situation for many Alsatians, including hardships for many, such as the malgré-nous. However, some advocates of autonomy for Alsace saw the new regime as a chance to reenacted rights for the culture and autonomy of the Alsatians formerly under French government. While few were actually attracted to the anti-semitism or authoritarianism of the regime, a number of Alsatian autonomists were subsequently accused of collaboration with Nazi officials after the war, some of which were trialed, prisoned, and even executed.

:fr:Fritz Spieser (1902-1987)
 :de:Paul Schall (1898-1981)
 :fr:Joseph Bilger (1905-1975)
 :fr:Marcel Stürmel (1900-1972)
:fr:Camille Dahlet (1883-1963)
:fr:Joseph Rossé (1892–1951)
Jean-Pierre Mourer (1897-1947)
Charles Hueber (1883-1943)
:fr:Charles Roos (1878-1940)
Eugène Ricklin (1862–1935)

After war, also related groups :fr:Nanziger and :fr:Loups Noirs remain notable.

However, other Alsatian were staunch opponents of the Nazi occupation, such as the artist Jean-Jacques Waltz.

After reattachment to France 

In contemporary Alsace, Unser Land, formed in 2009 after a merge of Union du peuple alsacien and Fer's Elsass, constitutes the most notable current political party associated with promotion of greater autonomy of Alsace. Alsace d'abord is another, smaller organisation.

Political parties 
 Alsace d'abord
 :fr:Robert Spieler (born 1951) (as well as other political parties)
 :fr:Jacques Cordonnier (born 1950)
 :fr:Front culturel alsacien
 :fr:André Weckmann (1924-2012) 
 :fr:Andrée Buchmann (born 1956)

 Unser land

Organisations 
 :fr:Solidarité alsacienne

Other 
 :fr:Pierre Zind (1923-1988)

Loss of regional status
Despite many protests, the new French region of Grand Est was introduced with ratification on 1 January 2016.

Gallery

See also

History 
 :es:Alsacia en 1789
November 1918 in Alsace-Lorraine
Alemannic separatism
 Grand Est#Opposition

Politics

Alsace d'abord (:fr:Espace nouveau jeune, :fr:Jeune Alsace)
Unser Land
:fr:Union du peuple alsacien
:fr:Fer's Elsass
:de:Nationalforum Elsass-Lothringen
 :fr:Front culturel alsacien
Popular Republican Union (part of Independents of Popular Action)

Footnotes

References 
 Heiko Haumann: „Schwäbisch-alemannische Demokratie“ gegen „Staufisch-schwäbischen Imperialismus“? Politische Konzeptionen in Baden und Württemberg 1945–1952. In Allmende. Zeitschrift für Literatur. Bd. 8, Nr. 20, Karlsruhe 1988, 36–52, ISSN 0720-3098.
 Manfred Joss: Schwäbisch-Alemannische Demokratie. Vision und Scheitern eines Separatstaats im deutschen Südwesten nach dem Zweiten Weltkrieg. Lizentiatsarbeit, Historisches Institut, Universität Bern 2005.
 Jürgen Klöckler: „Das Land der Alemannen …“. Pläne für einen Heimatstaat im Bodenseeraum nach 1945. UVK Verlagsgesellschaft, Konstanz 1999, .